Weeping Willow is a 1918 oil painting by Claude Monet which depicts a weeping willow tree growing at the edge of his water garden pond in Giverny, France. It is exhibited at the Columbus Museum of Art in Columbus, Ohio.

The painting is one of a series of Monet paintings of this weeping willow. It is
131 by 110.3 cm (51.6 × 43.5 in.), and was a gift to the museum by Howard and Babette Sirak.

Monet's Weeping Willow paintings

See also
List of paintings by Claude Monet
Water Lilies, Monet's large series of paintings of water lilies in the pond adjacent to where the depicted Weeping Willow grew.

References

Paintings by Claude Monet
Paintings in the collection of the Columbus Museum of Art
Water in art